42 Cassiopeiae is a possible binary star system in the northern circumpolar constellation of Cassiopeia. It is visible to the naked eye as a dim, blue-white hued star with a baseline apparent visual magnitude of +5.18. The system is located approximately 291 light years from the Sun based on parallax, and is drifting further away with a radial velocity of +7 km/s.

This is classified as a suspected eclipsing binary of the Algol type, with a period of 16.77 days and a magnitude decrease of 0.3. The primary is a B-type main-sequence star with a stellar classification of B9V. It is roughly 67 million years old and is spinning with a projected rotational velocity of 149 km/s. The star has 2.7 times the mass of the Sun and 2.6 times the Sun's radius. It is radiating 66 times the luminosity of the Sun from its photosphere at an effective temperature of 10,141 K.

References

B-type main-sequence stars
Spectroscopic binaries
Algol variables

Cassiopeia (constellation)
BD+69 0114
Cassiopeiae, 42
010250
008016
0480